Elmer Schoebel (September 8, 1896 – December 14, 1970) was an American jazz pianist, composer, and arranger.

Early life
He was born in East St. Louis, Illinois, United States.

Career
Schoebel played along to silent films in Champaign, Illinois early in his career. After moving on to vaudeville late in the 1910s, he played with the 20th Century Jazz Band in Chicago in 1920. In 1922-23 he was a member of the New Orleans Rhythm Kings, then led his own band, known variously as the Midway Gardens Orchestra, the Original Memphis Melody Boys and the Chicago Blues Dance Orchestra, before joining Isham Jones in 1925. After returning to Chicago he played with Louis Panico and Art Kassel, and arranged for the Melrose Publishing House.

In the 1930s, Schoebel wrote and arranged, working as the chief arranger for the Warner Brothers publishing division. From the 1940s onward he did some performing with Conrad Janis, Blue Steele's Rhythm Rebels (1958), and with his own ensembles in St. Petersburg, Florida. He continued to play up until his death.

Compositions
Schoebel wrote a number of standards, including "Bugle Call Rag", "Stomp Off, Let's Go","Nobody's Sweetheart Now", "Farewell Blues", and "Prince of Wails". "Prince of Wails" was the only composition Schoebel recorded as a leader, in 1929 as Brunswick 4652. He also wrote "I Never Knew What A Girl Could Do", "Oriental", and "Discontented Blues", while a member of the New Orleans Rhythm Kings.

References
Footnotes

General references
Kernfeld, Barry Dean, and Stanley Sadie. "New Orleans Rhythm Kings." The New Grove Dictionary of Jazz. London: Macmillan, 1988
New Orleans Rhythm Kings biography. The Red Hot Jazz Archive. Retrieved June 29, 2006
Kennedy, Rick. Jelly Roll, Bix, and Hoagy: Gennett Studios and the Birth of Recorded Jazz. Bloomington: Indiana UP, 1994. Print
Kenney, William Howland. Chicago Jazz: A Cultural History, 1904-1930. New York: Oxford UP, 1993
Scott Yanow, [ Elmer Schoebel] at AllMusic

External links
 Elmer Schoebel recordings at the Discography of American Historical Recordings

1896 births
1970 deaths
American jazz pianists
American male pianists
Jazz musicians from Illinois
20th-century American pianists
20th-century American male musicians
American male jazz musicians
New Orleans Rhythm Kings members